Rock & Pop may refer to:

 Rock & Pop (Chilean radio), a Chilean radio station from 1992
 Canal 2 Rock & Pop, a Chilean television channel 1995-1999; See Carmen Luz Parot